Kani-Kéli is a commune in the French overseas department of Mayotte, in the Indian Ocean.

Population

References

Populated places in Mayotte
Communes of Mayotte